Melinda is a 1972 American drama film directed by Hugh A. Robertson and written by Lonne Elder III. The film stars Calvin Lockhart, Rosalind Cash, Vonetta McGee, Paul Stevens, Rockne Tarkington and Ross Hagen. The film was released on August 16, 1972, by Metro-Goldwyn-Mayer.  This film marked karate champion Jim Kelly's first appearance in a film.

Plot
Frankie J. Parker is a Los Angeles radio disc jockey. In his spare time, Frankie takes karate lessons at a school run by his friend Charles Atkins. A woman in a rental car, newly arrived from Chicago, listens to Frankie's radio program. They meet at a nightclub owned by another of Frankie's friends, former football player Tank Robertson, where she introduces herself as Melinda. He invites her to a party on Tank's yacht, making girlfriend Terry Davis jealous. Frankie takes Melinda to his apartment, unaware that they are being followed by a thug. They make love and, the next morning, Melinda tells the womanizing, easy-going Frankie that he has the makings of a more serious, substantial man. After Frankie leaves for work, leaving Melinda alone in his apartment he begins to realize he has developing strong feelings for Melinda.  When he returns home from work, he finds the apartment ransacked and Melinda murdered.

It turns out her real name is Audrey Miller and she is the former mistress of a Chicago gangster named Mitch, who is trying to recover a mysterious item Melinda took with her to LA. A junkie, Marcia, tries to take Frankie at gunpoint, but he overpowers her. Frankie is attacked by two men, but manages to fight them off, helped by his karate training, although Marcia ends up dead. Frankie finds out that his friend Tank is a business associate of Mitch and owes him money. The item Melinda took is in a safe-deposit box at the bank, the key to which Melinda mailed to Frankie before she died. Unable to gain entry himself, Frankie permits girlfriend Terry to impersonate Melinda and retrieve the item, which turns out to be a gold cigarette case.

Inside the case is a tape recording that incriminates Mitch in a crime. Terry is taken prisoner, forcing Frankie to agree to come to Mitch's mansion to work out a trade. He takes the precaution of asking Atkins and his karate students to come along. When they find Terry is being held in a snake-filled cage, Frankie, Atkins and the others come to her rescue.

Cast
 Calvin Lockhart as Frankie J. Parker
 Rosalind Cash as Terry Davis
 Vonetta McGee as Audrey Miller / Melinda Lewis
 Paul Stevens as Mitch
 Rockne Tarkington as "Tank"
 Ross Hagen as Gregg Van
 Renny Roker as Dennis Smith
 Judyann Elder as Gloria
 Jim Kelly as Charles Atkins
 Jan Tice as Marcia
 Lonne Elder III as Lieutenant Daniels
 Edmund Cambridge as Detective
 George Fisher as Young Man
 Joe Hooker as Rome's Servant
 Allen Pinson as Rome
 Jack Manning as Bank Man
 Gene LeBell as Hood
 Gary Pagett as Sergeant Adams
 Khalil Bezaleel as Washington
 Nina Roman as Bank Woman
 Jeannie Bell as Jean
 Earl Maynard as Karate Group
 Dori Dixon as Karate Group
 Douglas C. Lawrence as Karate Group
 Evelyne Cuffee as Karate Group
 Peaches Jones as Karate Group

See also
 List of American films of 1972

References

External links 
 

1972 films
American drama films
1972 drama films
Metro-Goldwyn-Mayer films
Karate films
1970s English-language films
1970s American films